I Was a Shoplifter is a 1950 American film noir crime film directed by Charles Lamont and starring Scott Brady and Mona Freeman.

Plot
A shoplifter, Faye Burton, is being watched by Herb Klaxon, a security guard at a Los Angeles department store, and by Jeff Andrews, a shopper there. Jeff tries to warn her, but Faye is nevertheless caught and placed under arrest. Faye signs a confession and is set free, warned that if she tries this again, she will go to jail.

Faye returns to her job as a librarian, but a gang of thieves run by Ina Perdue, a pawnbroker, recruits Faye by claiming they can get her confession back, thereby clearing her record. Faye is shown by Ina and her henchman Pepe how to steal like a professional thief, and is then given a San Diego robbery assignment as a test. She is followed by Jeff, who is actually an undercover law officer, working to bust the shoplifting ring.

Pepe attempts to sexually assault Faye, who becomes so despondent, she tries to commit suicide. Jeff rescues her and reveals his true identity. They arrange to work together, but Jeff's cover is blown and Faye is kidnapped. Ina and Pepe take her to Mexico to continue their crime spree, but Jeff and his men arrive in time to apprehend the crooks. Jeff also realizes he has fallen in love with Faye.

Cast
 Scott Brady as Jeff Andrews
 Mona Freeman as Faye Burton
 Andrea King as Ina Perdue
 Tony Curtis as Pepe (as Anthony Curtis)
 Charles Drake as Herb Klaxon
 Gregg Martell as The Champ
 Larry Keating as Harry Dunson
 Robert Gist as Barkie Neff
 Michael Raffetto as Sheriff Bascom

References

External links
 
 
 

1950 films
Film noir
Films directed by Charles Lamont
American black-and-white films
1950 crime films
Universal Pictures films
American crime films
1950s English-language films
1950s American films